Richard Coyle is an English actor. He portrayed lead role of Father Faustus Blackwood in Netflix series Chilling Adventures of Sabrina, and Jeff Murdock in the sitcom Coupling.

Early and personal life
Coyle was born in Sheffield, England. Coyle is the second youngest of five sons. Their father was a builder. He began his acting career after a stint working on a ferry entertaining passengers, where he was told by a theatre director that he had a talent and should pursue it further. He graduated in Languages and Philosophy from the University of York in 1995 and was then accepted into the prestigious Bristol Old Vic Theatre School, graduating in 1998, the same year as his close friends Dean Lennox Kelly and Oded Fehr.

Coyle was married to actress Georgia Mackenzie. He was in a relationship with actress Ruth Bradley from early 2011 though by 2017 this had ended and he was seeing someone else.

Film and television work
He began by appearing in such television programmes as Lorna Doone, as John Ridd and Evelyn Waugh's wartime saga Sword of Honour, and in Mike Leigh's film Topsy-Turvy. He played Mr Coxe in 1999's BBC version of Wives and Daughters. In 2000, Coyle's big break arrived in the form of the character Jeff Murdock in the comedy Coupling. In 2003 he chose not to return to Coupling for its fourth series, and refused requests to return for a "goodbye episode". In a 2005 interview, Coyle stated this was to avoid typecasting:

He also starred in the short-lived 2002-2003 BBC show Strange, and had roles in the films Human Traffic, Franklyn, and  A Good Year. He appeared in the new special episode of Cracker: Nine Eleven in October 2006 (TV) and starred in The Whistleblowers on ITV. He also starred in the 2001 version of Othello as Michael Cassio.

In 2004, Coyle played the role of Alcock, body servant to John Wilmot, 2nd Earl of Rochester, in The Libertine alongside Johnny Depp. He appeared in Mike Newell's 2010 movie Prince of Persia: The Sands of Time, playing Jake Gyllenhaal's older brother, the ambiguous Crown Prince Tus.

He was cast as the lead role, Moist von Lipwig, in the film Going Postal, based on the book of the same name by Terry Pratchett. This was broadcast on television in May 2010.

Coyle had a leading role in Renny Harlin's film 5 Days of War, about the 2008 war between Russia and Georgia over the territory of South Ossetia. In September 2011, Coyle appeared as William Winthrop, in Madonna's feature-directorial debut W.E. about the Duke and Duchess of Windsor. He appeared as Garda Ciarán O'Shea in Grabbers, the Irish comedy monster movie. Coyle also plays Wallace in Outpost: Black Sun, the sequel to the 2008 British horror film Outpost, and the lead of drug pusher Frank in the 2012 English-language remake of Nicolas Winding Refn's 1996 cult classic Pusher.

In 2012, Coyle joined the cast of the USA Network show Covert Affairs as Simon Fischer, an FSB agent and love interest for Piper Perabo's Annie Walker. His character recurred until halfway through season three.

In 2014, NBC began airing the series Crossbones, with Coyle as Tom Lowe, who is assigned to kill the pirate Blackbeard (played by John Malkovich).

In 2018, Coyle was cast as Father Faustus Blackwood, a high priest of the Church of Night and Dean of the Academy of the Unseen Arts in the Netflix series Chilling Adventures of Sabrina.

In January 2021, Coyle announced via Instagram that he has been cast in Fantastic Beasts: The Secrets of Dumbledore, scheduled to be released in 2022 but said he could not disclose whom he was playing. When the trailer came out that December, it was confirmed that he would be playing Aberforth Dumbledore.

Stage roles

He was cast as the lead in Peter Gill's 2002 stage premiere of The York Realist, and later in the Donmar Warehouse production of the play Proof, in London, alongside Gwyneth Paltrow, and on the success of this he was cast in Patrick Marber's reworking of August Strindberg's play After Miss Julie with Kelly Reilly and Helen Baxendale. From September to November 2004, Coyle played the title role in Michael Grandage's production of Friedrich Schiller's Don Carlos which then transferred to the West End from January to April 2005. The cast also included Derek Jacobi, Peter Eyre and Una Stubbs. The V&A theatre archive has a copy of a film of the production which can be privately viewed.
He was in Peter Gill's production of John Osborne's Look Back in Anger at the Theatre Royal, Bath from August to September 2006. In 2008 Richard starred in Harold Pinter's The Lover and The Collection at the Comedy Theatre in London, alongside Charlie Cox and Gina McKee.

In 2010 he played John in Mark Haddon's play Polar Bears at the Donmar Warehouse, London.

His own theatre company was scheduled to debut at the refurbished Arcola Theatre in Dalston, London in March 2013, with Coyle starring alongside his friend and co-founder Rafe Spall in Simon Bent's play The Associate.

In 2014 he played MacDuff in the Kenneth Branagh and Rob Ashford directed Macbeth at the Park Avenue Armory, New York City.

Coyle originated the role of Larry Lamb in James Graham's new play Ink which opened at the Almeida Theatre directed by Rupert Goold before transferring to the Duke of York's Theatre in the West End. Coyle stars alongside Bertie Carvel who plays Rupert Murdoch.

From 10 March until 19 November 2022 Coyle starred in the role of Atticus Finch in the West End debut of Aaron Sorkin's adaptation of Harper Lee's American classic, To Kill a Mockingbird.

Other media

Coyle played Keats in the game Folklore and has also narrated the following audio books: At The Mountains of Madness and The Shadow Over Innsmouth by H. P. Lovecraft, Resistance by Owen Sheers, and the H.I.V.E. series of novels by Mark Walden.

Filmography

Film

Television

References

Sources

External links 
 
 "Richard Coyle Talks Tom Lowe" – video of short interview with Coyle about Crossbones role

Alumni of the University of York
Living people
20th-century English male actors
21st-century English male actors
English male film actors
English male television actors
Year of birth missing (living people)